Clement Chima Nwafor was a Nigerian surgeon and politician. He served as the first civilian Deputy Governor of Abia State from 1992 to 1993.

References 

1946 births
2006 deaths
People from Abia State
Deputy Governors of Abia State
Igbo politicians
Peoples Democratic Party (Nigeria) politicians